The Battle of Fort Point Peter was a successful attack in early 1815 by a British force on a smaller American force on the Georgia side of the St. Marys River near St. Marys, Georgia. The river was then part of the international border between the United States and British-allied Spanish Florida; it now forms part of the boundary between Georgia and Florida. Occupying coastal Camden County allowed the British to blockade American transportation on the Intracoastal Waterway. The attack on Forts St. Tammany and Peter occurred in January 1815, after the signing of the Treaty of Ghent, which would end the War of 1812, but before the treaty's ratification. The attack occurred at the same time as the siege of Fort St. Philip in Louisiana and was part of the British occupation of St. Marys and Cumberland Island.

Forts at St. Marys 
Point Peter is the first landing site on the Georgia side of the St. Marys River.  It is a peninsula between the North River and Point Peter Creek, which flow into the St. Marys River. James Seagrove and Jacob Weed received land grants nearby in 1787, and a military post was established on Point Peter around that time. In July 1794 Paul Hyacinth Perrault was commissioned to build a fort in St. Marys, probably Ft. St. Tammany. The following year, costs exceeded $1,400. The War Department approved payments relating to the fort in 1797 and 1800. The garrison eventually included a fort, battery, and a mooring for naval vessels, and may also have been known as Fort Gunn in 1794.

United States military posted at Point Peter were responsible for enforcing tariffs and protecting the nation's southern border with Spanish Florida. The fort became involved in the Quasi-War in 1798. Between 1793 and 1805, United States military manned the fort, and $16,000 dollars were spent on the Point Peter garrison. However, by 1806 the fort was at least partially dismantled, and defenses relied instead solely on gunboats and a fixed battery, which might have contributed to the July 1805 St. Marys River incident involving British naval personnel and successive French and Spanish privateers. In 1809, the block house and battery that formed the new American fort were approved.

1810–1814
In 1811, eleven of the United States Navy's 165 gunboats were stationed at St. Marys, making it the third-largest naval station in the United States prior to the War of 1812. The gunboats were powered by lateen sails and oars, and mounted heavy guns.

In 1811, the commander of Fort Point Peter, Lt. Col. Thomas Adam Smith, and his junior officers, Captain Abraham Massias, Captain Joseph Woodruff, Lieutenant Daniel Appling, Captain Fiedler Ridgeway, and Lieutenant Elias Stallings, received orders to assist an American takeover of Spanish Florida if a rebellion or invasion took place. However, few officers became involved in the Patriot War of East Florida over the next few years. President Madison and Secretary of State Monroe never gave direct orders to the Point Peter garrison to act in that conflict, unlike the later orders in the War of 1812.

In the fall of 1812, the Camden County Battalion was raised at Point Peter. It served in the 1st Brigade of General John Floyd's army division, which participated in the Creek Wars.

Battle of Fort Point Peter 1815
On January 10, 1815, British forces under the command of Admiral Sir George Cockburn landed on Cumberland Island off the Georgia coast. The British force consisted of the three Royal Marines Battalions (560 men in the 1st & 2nd, plus the six companies of the 3rd), ships' detachments of Royal Marines from the squadron (120 men), and two companies from the 2nd West India Regiment from The Bahamas (190 men).

On January 13 a British force first bombarded Fort Peter and then landed on Point Peter by the town of St. Marys. The British attacked and took the fort without suffering any casualties.

The British land force then headed for St. Marys. On their way, they encountered a small American force of 160 soldiers of the 43rd Infantry Regiment and the Rifle Corps under Captain Abraham A. Massias. A skirmish ensued before the Americans retreated. Massias estimated the size of the British force as 1500 men. He reported that American casualties on 13 January included 1 killed, 4 wounded, and 9 missing. Although Massias believed that British suffered numerous casualties, they reported only three men killed and five wounded in the entire expedition.

On 15 January the British captured St. Marys despite Fort St. Tammany just outside the town. American reports suggest that the British looted the town's jewelry store and stole fine china and other goods from the residents. British reports are that the town's inhabitants agreed to terms under which residents gave up all public property and British troops respected all private property. British forces captured two American gunboats and 12 merchantmen, including the East Indiaman , which the American privateer Sabine had captured as Countess of Harcourt was on her way from London to Isle of France (Mauritius). Prize money for Countess of Harcourt, the bark Maria Theresa, goods from the ship Carl Gustaff, and the schooner Cooler, was paid in April 1824.

The British ended their occupation of St. Marys and Fort St. Tammany after about a week. They burned Fort Point Peter, including its blockhouses and barracks, and withdrew to Cumberland Island. The officers lived at Dungeness, the former mansion of the widow of deceased Revolutionary war hero General Nathanael Greene. Most British troops were stationed at the island's south end, and the British ships anchored in Cumberland sound. At the end of February 1815, Rear Admiral Cockburn received news of the Treaty of Ghent through newspapers, but refused to accept such as official proof and continued to ship refugees away from Florida and Georgia. In all, the British freed 1485 slaves.

The British departed from Cumberland Island on March 15, although a ship stuck on a sandbar and Albion remained in Cumberland Sound until March 18.

Point Peter 1815–1821
In 1818, the federal government purchased the land. In 1819, the Adams–Onís Treaty was signed, and Florida was transferred to the United States in 1821.

By the Civil War, Fort Point Peter had become a ruin. In 1870, Daniel Proctor purchased the property from the United States, who sold it to Alexander Curtis.

Present day
In 1953, Georgia placed a historical marker at the Point Peter battlefield. In 2002, a planned housing development at Point Peter spurred archaeological interest in the former forts. The developer, required to survey the cultural resources being disturbed, hired Scott Butler (an archaeologist for Brockington and Associates) to conduct a study. As of 2009, archaeologists had found thousands of artifacts, including cannons, muskets, musket balls, knives, and uniform buttons.

Fort St. Tammany, the fort in St. Marys, was located where Howard Gilman Memorial Waterfront Park is today. It is identified as Georgia Archaeological Site 9Cm164; to date there has been no detailed study of the ruins.

The Cumberland Island National Seashore Museum in downtown St. Marys has opened a semi-permanent exhibit, "The Forgotten Invasion", in remembrance of the battle. The exhibit includes a recovered sunken anchor from a British warship in addition to finds from Scott Butler's excavation.

See also 
 St. Marys Historic District (Georgia)
History of Camden County, Georgia
 War of 1812
 Seminole Wars
 Republic of East Florida

Notes

References

Citations

Sources 

 Elliott, Daniel T. "Point Peter and the St. Marys River Forts". The LAMAR Institute, Vol 62. August 2002.
 Waciuma, Wanjohi. Intervention in Spanish Florida, 1801–1813: A Study in Jeffersonian Foreign Policy.
 Cusick, James G. The Other War of 1812: The Patriot War and the American Invasion of Spanish East Florida. University of Georgia Press, 2003.
 Bullard, Mary R. Black Liberation on Cumberland Island in 1815. (University of Georgia Press, 1983).
 de Grummond, Jane Lucas(ed), and George S. Gaines, Richard Terrell, Alexander C. Henderson, Andrew Jackson and Alexander Cochrane. "Platter of Glory", Louisiana History: The Journal of the Louisiana Historical Association, Vol. 3, No. 4 (Autumn, 1962), pp. 316–359.

External links 
 Point Peter historical marker
 Point Peter Battery and the War of 1812 historical marker

Fort Peter
Fort Peter
1815 in the United States
Fort Peter
History of Georgia (U.S. state)
1815 in Georgia (U.S. state)
War of 1812 forts
January 1815 events